This is a list of mayors of Montreal, Quebec, since the city was incorporated in 1832. Party colours do not indicate affiliation or resemblance to a provincial or a federal party.

Mayors of Montreal

Applebaum is the most recent non-francophone mayor, the last being James John Edmund Guerin in 1912. Applebaum is the first Jewish mayor for the city with previous holders either French Canadian, Scottish, Irish or English descent.

Footnotes

See also
 Mayor of Montreal
 List of leaders of the Official Opposition (Montreal)
 Montreal City Council
 Timeline of Montreal history
 History of Montreal
 History of Quebec
 List of governors of Montreal

External links
 City of Montreal list of mayors

Mayors Of Montreal
Mayors Of Montreal
 
Montreal
Mayors Of Montreal